Cypa duponti is a species of moth of the family Sphingidae. It is known from Thailand, Sumatra, Java and Borneo.

References

Cypa
Moths described in 1941